Vesselin Stanev is a Bulgarian pianist.

Biography 
Stanev was born in Varna in 1964. Initially he studied at the National Academy of Music in Sofia, after that at the Moscow Conservatory, and finally - at the Conservatoire de Paris.

He is noted for being an excellent Romantic classical music performer, and one of the few pianists to have a recording of the complete cycle of Liszt's Transcendental Etudes.

He has given performances at Wigmore Hall, Alte Oper, Gewandhaus, Salle Gaveau and KlangBogen Wien, among others. Stanev has performed in many European countries, Russia and Japan.

Stanev has been praised for his brilliant playing style and ability to express the nature of Romantic musical works. He has been labeled by Pravda Online "a modest genius".

Currently he resides in Switzerland.

Discography 
Franz Liszt - Réminiscences de Norma, Dante Sonata, Mephisto Waltz No. 1, Réminiscences de Don Juan (RCA Red Seal, 2014).
 Undine: Music for Flute and Piano - Works by Haydn, W. A. Mozart, F. X. Mozart, Mendelssohn, Schubert, Bizet, Reinicke, Schumann, Donizetti (with Eva Oertle, flute; Sony Classical, 2013)
 Franz Liszt - Etudes d'exécution transcendante S 139 (1851) (RCA Red Seal), 2010)
 Alexander Scriabin - Preludes op. 11 / Sonatas (Sony Classical, 2006)
 Frédéric Chopin - 12 Etudes op. 10 / 12 Etudes op. 25 (Gega New, 2003)
 Ludwig van Beethoven / Robert Schumann - Fifteen Variations and Fugue in E flat major, Op.35, “Eroica Variations” / Kreisleriana, Op.16 (Gega New, 2002)
 Robert Schumann / Franz Liszt - Fantasie in C major, Op. 17 / Sonata in B minor, S178 (Gega New, 2001)
 Frédéric Chopin / Maurice Ravel / Sergey Rachmaninov - 24 Preludes, op. 28 / Gaspard de la nuit / Sonata No.2, op. 36 (Gega New, 2000)
 Frédéric Chopin / Sergey Rachmaninov / Franz Liszt - Ballades; Scherzo, Polonaise, Barcarolle op. 23, 52, 39, 44, 60 / Moments Musicaux, op. 16 / Hungarian Rhapsodies, S244, Nos. 11 & 12 (Gega New, 1997)

References

External links 
 Official website

Bulgarian classical pianists
Living people
Musicians from Varna, Bulgaria
Bulgarian expatriates in Switzerland
Moscow Conservatory alumni
Conservatoire de Paris alumni
21st-century classical pianists
Year of birth missing (living people)